Highway 135 is a highway in the Canadian province of Saskatchewan. It runs from Highway 106 to Sandy Bay.

Route

It runs north part Mirond Lake, and crosses the narrows between Mirond and Pelican lakes at Pelican Narrows, and passes through the community of Pelican Narrows within the Peter Ballantyne Cree Nation.
From there it runs generally northeast, crosses the Nemei River, and turns north to Sandy Bay on the Churchill River.

References

135